East Garo Hills is an administrative district in the state of Meghalaya in India.

History
The East Garo Hills district was formed in 1976, after the erstwhile Garo Hills district of Meghalaya was re-organised with a view to bring the administration closer to the people.

The district headquarters-complex of the district, christened as Williamnagar after the name of Captain Williamson A. Sangma the founder Chief Minister of the State of Meghalaya. Williamnagar is located on the vast plainlands along the bank of the Simsang River, at Simsanggre. These plainlands are in a sense historical, as it was here that the Garos made their last major resistance to the British intrusion into Garo Hills during the year 1837. The legendary Garo leader Pa Togan Nengminja Sangma was felled by the British, in skirmish, at Chisobibra, quite close to Wiliamnagar, on 12 December 1837.

Geography
The district headquarters are located at Williamnagar. The district occupies an area of 2603 km².

Divisions

Lok Sabha
The district falls under the Tura (Lok Sabha constituency) which Purno Agitok Sangma had been represented at the Lok Sabha, the Lower House of the Indian Parliament since 1975-2016. Purno Agitok Sangma had been former Union Minister and has the distinction of being the only unanimously elected Speaker of the Lok Sabha (during the 11th Lok Sabha). After his death, his son Conrad Sangma representing this constituency.

Assembly Constituency
There are 3 (three) Assembly Constituencies of the Meghalaya State Legislative Assembly within the East Garo Hills District of Meghalaya. The Assembly Constituencies are as follows:

 SONGSAK (ST) 
 RONGJENG (ST) 
 WILLIAMNAGAR (ST)

Administrative divisions
East Garo Hills division is divided into five blocks:

Demographics
According to the 2011 census East Garo Hills district has a population of 317,917, roughly equal to the nation of The Bahamas. This gives it a ranking of 569th in India (out of a total of 640). Its population growth rate over the decade 2001-2011 was  26.75%. East Garo Hills has a sex ratio of 968 females for every 1000 males, and a literacy rate of 75.51%.

Languages
East Garo's languages include A'Tong, a Tibeto-Burman language spoken by 10,000 people in Bangladesh and India.

Flora and fauna
In 1986 East Garo Hills district, along with its sister districts South and West Garo Hills, became home to Nokrek National Park.

References

External links
East Garo Hills District Administration Official Website

 
Districts of Meghalaya
1976 establishments in Meghalaya
Autonomous regions of India